Dihydroceramide desaturase is the enzyme involved in the conversion of dihydroceramide into ceramide by inserting the 4,5-trans-double bond to the sphingolipid backbone of dihydroceramide.

The activity of DDase is influenced by several factors as 
 alkyl chain length of the sphingoid base (in the order C18 > C12 > C8) and fatty acid (C8 > C18)
 The stereochemistry of the sphingoid base (D-erythro- > L-threo-dihydroceramides)
 the nature of the headgroup, with the highest activity with dihydroceramide, but some (approximately 20%) activity with dihydroglucosylceramide
 The ability to utilize alternative reductants like ascorbic acid could substitute for a reduced pyridine nucleotide, but it act as  inhibitory at higher concentrations.

N-[(1R,2S)-2-hydroxy-1-hydroxymethyl-2-(2-tridecyl-1-cyclopropenyl)ethyl]octanamide (GT11), is the inhibitor DDase activity.

References 

Enzymes